The Education (Miscellaneous Provisions) Act 1948 was an Act of the Parliament of the United Kingdom. It was passed during the Labour government of Clement Attlee. Amongst other provisions, it empowered local authorities to provide items of clothing in cases where pupils were unable due to the unsuitability or inadequacy of their clothing to take full advantage of the education provided at their schools. It was repealed on 1 November 1996 by the Education Act 1996.

Notes

United Kingdom Acts of Parliament 1948
Education in the United Kingdom